Carrier Air Wing Three (CVW-3), known as the "Battle Axe", is a United States Navy aircraft carrier air wing based at Naval Air Station Oceana, Virginia. The wing was created on 1 July 1938 and has seen service in World War II, the Korean War, the Cuban Missile Crisis, the Vietnam War, Lebanon, against Libya, and the Global War on Terror.

Mission
"To conduct carrier air warfare operations and assist in the planning, control, coordination and integration of seven air wing squadrons in support of carrier air warfare including; Interception and destruction of enemy aircraft and missiles in all-weather conditions to establish and maintain local air superiority. All-weather offensive air-to-surface attacks, Detection, localization, and destruction of enemy ships and submarines to establish and maintain local sea control. Aerial photographic, sighting, and electronic intelligence for naval and joint operations. Airborne early warning service to fleet forces and shore warning nets. Airborne electronic countermeasures. In-flight refueling operations to extend the range and the endurance of air wing aircraft and Search and rescue operations."

Subordinate units

CVW-3 consists of nine squadrons:

History
Squadrons assigned to the first carrier to bear the name in 1928 were informally called the Saratoga Air Group. On 1 July 1938 the Saratoga Air Group was formally established as a unit.  With the rapid fleet buildup of World War II, the Navy ceased naming its carrier air groups with the carrier's name and initially numbered them with the carrier's hull number, and on 25 September 1943 Saratoga Air Group was redesignated Carrier Air Group 3 (CVG-3). After the war, on 15 November 1946 the air group was redesignated in accordance with the Navy's new carrier air group designation scheme in which all remaining air groups were designated in accordance with the type of carrier to which they were assigned with those assigned to s being designated "attack" carrier air groups and those assigned to the larger  being designated battle carrier air groups and CVG-3 was redesignated CVAG-3. On 1 September 1948 the Navy again changed the carrier air group designation scheme; all CVAGs and CVBGs were designated CVGs and CVAG-3 once again became CVG-3.  On 20 December 1963 all carrier air groups in existence were redesignated Carrier Air Wings (CVW) and Carrier Air Group 3 (CVG-3) was redesignated Carrier Air Wing 3 (CVW-3)

World War II
The wing was deployed on Saratoga until the ship was torpedoed in January 1942. Part of the wing was then deployed aboard  and helped cripple the  during the Battle of Midway.

Cold War

Korean War
In 1950, Leyte was recalled from the Mediterranean Sea and was deployed to Korea. The Wing flew in support of the Pusan Perimeter, the invasion on Wonsan and, and strikes on Hungnam Salient and Yalu River Bridges. The wing accumulated over 11,000 operational hours flying against the North Korean and Chinese Communist Forces. Following this deployment, CVG-3 made two more deployments to the Med aboard Leyte in 1951 and 1952-53, followed by a world cruise aboard  in 1953-54. In 1955-56, the wing was again in the Med aboard , before being assigned to the newly commissioned  in 1957. The wing stayed aboard Saratoga until she entered her Service Life Extension Program (SLEP) in 1981.

Cuban Missile Crisis
During refresher training in the Caribbean Sea in December 1962, CVW-3 was on station during the Cuban Missile Crisis. Carrier Air Group 3 was redesignated Carrier Air Wing 3 on 20 December 1963.

At end of the 1960s the air wing took on Reserve Squadrons during the USS Pueblo incident. CVW-3 squadrons embarked with the Royal Navy's 892 Naval Air Squadron for two weeks, and flew in response to a number of events in the Mediterranean including; hijackings, internal fighting in Jordan, and the death of Egyptian President Nasser.

Vietnam
In the early 1970s CVW-3 began the task of testing the new CV Concept, to incorporating the missions of attack squadrons and anti-submarine submarine squadrons. After completing their missions successfully the CV Concept was validated and implemented. In 1972, CVW-3 was given 60 hours notice before deploying around South Africa en route to Vietnam.  Operations there saw CVW-3 provide strike and support sorties in South Vietnam, Alpha strikes, AAW missions, and reconnaissance missions over North Vietnam.  The wings first kill came on 21 June when an F-4J Phantom II shot down a MIG-21.  Dropping over 14,000 tons of ordnance, CVW-3 spent 175 days on the line engaged in combat operations against North Vietnam.

Lebanon

Libya
In January 1989 two CVW-3 F-14 Tomcats shot down two hostile Libyan MIG-23 fighters over international waters in the Central Mediterranean. In August 1990, CVW-3 and John F. Kennedy departed on a no-notice Mediterranean/Red Sea deployment in support of Operation Desert Shield, and air crews later flew combat sorties in association with Operation Desert Storm against Iraq.

In 1994–95, CVW-3 made a single deployment aboard  to the Mediterranean Sea. During this time, the wing aircraft participated in Operation Desert Fox, a four-day strike campaign against Iraq in December 1998.

Global War on Terror
The early months of 2001 saw the air wing operating in the Persian Gulf, conducting Response Options strikes, to include the largest strike over Iraq since Operation Desert Fox, in support of Operation Southern Watch and maritime interdiction operations. This was the longest period any carrier had spent in the Gulf since Operation Desert Storm. The Air Wing completed its 25th deployment and returned home on 23 May 2001.

On 5 December 2002, CVW-3 departed for its 26th deployment to the Mediterranean, in support of Operation Enduring Freedom and on 20 March 2003, CVW-3 began taking part in the Iraq War, flying defensive counter air missions in Western Iraq, launching aircraft off the coast of Egypt in the South Eastern Mediterranean. CVW-3 made four deployments aboard Harry S. Truman to the Mediterranean Sea and the Indian Ocean between 2004 and 2010.

2013–2014 OEF Cruise

On 7 January 2013 Captain Sara A. Joyner, USN, took command of Carrier Air Wing Three, becoming the first woman to lead a U.S. Navy carrier air wing as well as the air wing's 57th CAG.  Before assuming command of CVW-3, Joyner had served as its deputy commander. On 22 December 2013, Joyner was superseded by her air wing's deputy commander (DCAG), Capt. George Wikoff. After a period at NAVAIRLANT, in 2016 Joyner is Director, Senate Liaison Office, Office of Legislative Liaison, U.S. Department of the Navy.

CVW-3 completed a deployment to the U.S. 5th and 6th Fleet in April 2014, after nine months at sea.

On 31 March 2021, CVW-3 launched flight operations in support of Operation Inherent Resolve. The USS Dwight D. Eisenhower and its carrier strike group were expected to lead Task Force 50, which oversees Operation Inherent Resolve's naval strike operations.

Current force

Fixed-wing aircraft
 F/A-18E/F Super Hornet
 EA-18G Growler
 E-2 Hawkeye
 C-2 Greyhound

Rotary wing aircraft
 MH-60R Seahawk
 MH-60S Knighthawk

References

External links
 U.S. Navy, Official CVW-3 site
 GlobalSecurity.org, Carrier Air Wing Three

 CVW-03
Military units and formations in Virginia
Military units and formations of the United States in the Gulf War
Military units and formations established in 1963